Ochiltree, Skares, Netherthird and Craigens was one of 32 electoral wards of East Ayrshire Council. Created in 1999, the ward elected one councillor using the first-past-the-post voting electoral system.

The ward produced strong results for both the Scottish National Party (SNP) and Labour Co-operative who both polled over 40% at every election. The SNP held the seat from 1999 to 2003 and Labour Co-op held the seat from 2003 until 2007.

In 2007, the ward was abolished and replaced by the multi-member Cumnock and New Cumnock ward as council elections moved to a proportional voting system – the single transferable vote – following the implementation of the Local Governance (Scotland) Act 2004.

Boundaries
The Ochiltree, Skares, Netherthird and Craigens ward was created in 1999 by the Third Statutory Reviews of Electoral Arrangements from the previous Drongan, Ochiltree, Rankinston and Stair, Cumnock South and Old Cumnock and Cumnock West and Auchinleck wards. The ward took in a rural area around the villages of Ochiltree and Skares as well as the southern part of Cumnock including the neighbourhoods of Netherthird and Craigens. In 2007, the ward was abolished as the Local Governance (Scotland) Act 2004 saw proportional representation and new multi-member wards introduced. The majority of the area covered by the Ochiltree, Skares, Netherthird and Craigens ward was placed into the new Cumnock and New Cumnock ward and an area in the south of the ward was placed in the Doon Valley ward.

Councillors

Election results

2003 election

1999 election

References

Wards of East Ayrshire
Cumnock